Clam Lake may refer to several places in the United States:

Michigan
Clam Lake, a historic settlement that became Cadillac, Michigan, in Wexford County
Clam Lake Township, Michigan, in Wexford County
Clam Lake Canal, in Wexford County
Clam Lake (Waterford Township, Michigan), a lake in Oakland County
Clam Lake, a lake in the Elk River Chain of Lakes Watershed, Antrim County

Other states
Clam Lake, Wisconsin, an unincorporated community
Clam Lake, a lake in Martin County, Minnesota